Konwika Apinyapong (born 24 November 1987) is a Thai indoor volleyball player. 
She is a member of the Thailand women's national volleyball team.
She participated at the 2006 Asian Games, and 2007 FIVB Volleyball Women's World Cup.

Clubs
  Nakhonratchasima (2011)

References

External links
 FIVB Biography
 2007 Women's World Cup - Photo Gallery
 Women Volleyball Asia Games 2006 Doha (QAT) - 30.11-12.12 Winner China

1987 births
Living people
Konwika Apinyapong
Volleyball players at the 2006 Asian Games
Konwika Apinyapong
Konwika Apinyapong
Konwika Apinyapong